The 1893 County Championship was the fourth officially organised running of the County Championship, and ran from 11 May to 28 August 1893. Yorkshire County Cricket Club claimed their first title, ending Surrey's run of three consecutive titles.

Table
 One point was awarded for a win, and one point was taken away for each loss.

Leading averages

References

External links
1893 County Championship  at CricketArchive

1893 in English cricket
County Championship seasons
County